Rudbast District is a district (bakhsh) in Babolsar County, Mazandaran Province, Iran. At the 2006 census, its population was 27,244, in 7,120 families.  The District has one city: Kalleh Bast. The District has two rural districts (dehestan): Khoshk Rud Rural District and Pazevar Rural District.

References 

Babolsar County
Districts of Mazandaran Province